Shiradhon is a village in Nanded district, Maharashtra, India.

Shiradhon is famous for its Bhimashankar temple. Lord Bhimashankar is an avatar of Lord Mahadev.

References 

Villages in Nanded district